The 1999–2000 NBA season was the 30th season of the National Basketball Association in Cleveland, Ohio. The Cavaliers had the eighth pick in the 1999 NBA draft, and selected Andre Miller from the University of Utah. During the off-season, the team acquired Lamond Murray from the Los Angeles Clippers, and signed free agent Mark Bryant. After playing just five games the previous season, Zydrunas Ilgauskas would miss the entire season due to foot injuries. Under new head coach Randy Wittman, the Cavaliers played around .500 with an 11–9 start in their first 20 games, but then continued to struggle losing ten of their next eleven games. The team finished 6th in the Central Division with a 32–50 record.

Shawn Kemp led the team with 17.8 points, 8.8 rebounds and 1.2 blocks per game, while Murray averaged 15.9 points, 5.7 rebounds and 1.4 steals per game, and Bob Sura provided the team with 13.8 points and 3.9 assists per game. In addition, Miller provided with 11.1 points and 5.8 assists per game, was named to the NBA All-Rookie First Team, and finished in fourth place in Rookie of the Year voting, while Brevin Knight contributed 9.3 points, 7.0 assists and 1.6 steals per game, and Wesley Person contributed 9.2 points per game. Danny Ferry contributed 7.3 points per game off the bench, while on the defensive side, Andrew DeClercq averaged 6.6 points and 5.4 rebounds per game, and Bryant provided with 5.7 points and 4.7 rebounds per game.

Following the season, Kemp was traded to the Portland Trail Blazers, while Sura was traded to the Golden State Warriors, DeClercq was dealt to the Orlando Magic, Bryant was released to free agency, and Danny Ferry signed as a free agent with the San Antonio Spurs. For the season, the Cavaliers changed their uniforms, which would remain in use until 2003.

Offseason

Draft picks

*1st round pick acquired from Boston in Vitaly Potapenko deal.

Roster

Roster Notes
 Center Zydrunas Ilgauskas missed the entire season due to a foot injury.

Regular season

Season standings

Record vs. opponents

Game log

|-style="background:#cfc;"
| 19 || December 11, 1999 || Atlanta
| W 127–116
|
|
|
| Gund Arena11,328
| 10–9
|-style="background:#fcc;"
| 26 || December 23, 1999 || @ Atlanta
| L 90–108
|
|
|
| Philips Arena12,528
| 11–15

|-style="background:#fcc;"
| 47 || February 5, 2000 || Atlanta
| L 94–102
|
|
|
| Gund Arena18,595
| 19–28

|-style="background:#fcc;"
| 80 || April 16, 2000 || @ Atlanta
| L 101–104
|
|
|
| Philips Arena14,061
| 31–49

Player statistics

Regular season

Player Statistics Citation:

Awards and records
 Andre Miller, NBA All-Rookie Team, First Team

Transactions

References

 Cleveland Cavaliers on Database Basketball
 Cleveland Cavaliers on Basketball Reference

Cleveland Cavaliers seasons
Cleveland
Cleve
Cleve